The Boulevards of the Marshals are a collection of thoroughfares that encircle the city of Paris, France, just inside its city limits. Most bear the name of a marshal of the First French Empire (1804–1814) who served under Napoleon I. The Île-de-France tramway Lines 3a and 3b today run on the Boulevards of the Marshals.

The demolition of the Thiers wall during the 1920s allowed for the creation of this ring of boulevards surrounding the city, using the land just inside the wall itself. Later, the Boulevard Périphérique, a short distance 'outboard' of the Boulevards of the Marshals, was built on the site of the Thiers wall itself, though it is more like a motorway than a wide boulevard.

History

The Boulevards of the Marshals occupy the route of the former Rue Militaire, built and owned by the French military and running on the inside of the fortified Thiers wall, completed around 1840. In 1859, the military engineering service gave conditional control of the Rue Militaire and Thiers wall to the Paris city council. The expansion of the land area of Paris in 1860, by annexing bordering communities, created a situation where everything within the Thiers wall was Paris and everything without was not. The large berm immediately outside the wall and its dry moat led to a profound disruption and complication of the synergistic relationship between Paris and its suburbs.

In the 1920s, the dismantling of the enclosure permitted the building of a series of boulevards encircling the city, in the same way that the destruction of the wall of Louis XIII had eventually given birth, at the end of the 17th century, to the great boulevards of the right bank.  This also served to re-integrate, to a large extent, Paris with its hinterland.

The Boulevards of the Marshals concept was almost fully realized by 1932, but the section known as Boulevard Amiral Bruix (an admiral rather than a marshal) was not incorporated until 1987. The Boulevard du General Martial Valin, a general of the World War II Free French air corps, and the Boulevard du General Jean Simon, another officer of the Free French and a hero of the liberation of Paris, were not added to the circle until 2005.

Exceptions
Three of the boulevards are named for famous military leaders who were not amongst the 26 marshals of the First Empire: Étienne Eustache Bruix (1759–1805), a French admiral;  (1912–2003), a distinguished general of the French Foreign Legion; and Martial Henri Valin (1898–1980), an air force general.

Of the 26 marshals of the First Empire, seven have not been immortalized by having their names attached to boulevards comprising the ring. These includePierre Augereau, Jean-Baptiste Bernadotte, Emmanuel de Grouchy, Auguste de Marmont, Bon-Adrien Jeannot de Moncey, Nicolas Oudinot, and Catherine-Dominique de Pérignon.

Of the seven marshals without a boulevard, three of them were given streets: Augereau (rue Augereau in the 7th arrondissement), Moncey (rue Moncey in the 9th arrondissement), and Oudinot (rue Oudinot in the 7th arrondissement). Only four of the 26 Marshals were never given any streets or boulevards in Paris. Those include: Bernadotte, Marmont, Pérignon, and Grouchy. Bernadotte, better known as Charles XIV John of Sweden, was widely considered as a traitor when he joined forces with the Allies against Napoleon after ascending to the Swedish throne. Marmont, who was formerly a close friend of the Emperor, betrayed him after the War of the Sixth Coalition when he defected to the Allies and refused to defend Paris from the invaders. Pérignon was also considered to have been treacherous for his role in trying to impede Napoleon's return from Elba during the Hundred Days; the latter had Pérignon expunged from the list of Marshals for that offense. Grouchy's omission is a very different case. He was a fine cavalry commander with a distinguished career in service of France and was loyal to Napoleon beyond reproach. However, Grouchy's unfortunate judgment at the Battle of Waterloo caused him to be vilified among Bonapartists and is accused by many as being the reason that France was defeated and Napoleon was forced into exile. 

There is a slight discontinuity in the loop around the city near the Garigliano Bridge: between the Boulevard du Général-Martial-Valin, in the 15th arrondissement, and Boulevard Murat in the 16th. On the right-bank side of the Garigliano Bridge (16th arrondissement), one may take the Quai Saint-Exupéry a little more than a hundred meters to meet the Boulevard Exelmans, which leads to Boulevard Murat, or, if one chooses to continue on Exelmans, one will meet the Boulevard Suchet near Porte d'Auteuil. Technically, the Boulevard Exelmans is not part of the Boulevards of the Marshals; he, Rémi Joseph Isidore Exelmans, was aide-de-camp to Marshal Murat during the First-Empire period, but he became a marshal in his own right during the Second Empire (1851).

In the 19th arrondissement, the Boulevard d'Indochine and the Boulevard d'Algérie follow the contour of Paris more closely than the Boulevards of the Marshals by avoiding a portion of the Boulevard Sérurier.

List of boulevards

Below is a list of the boulevards in Paris named after marshals of France. The list starts at the Porte de Vincennes and continues in ascending numerical order of arrondissements, from the 12th to the 20th; in effect, around Paris in clockwise fashion, beginning from the 3:00 position. Also noted are the connections to the Paris Métro, the Réseau Express Régional (RER), the Paris Tramway Line 3, the city gates of Paris, and the main roads leaving the capital for adjacent communes.

Legend:

Transportation 

The boulevards are, of course, city streets and open to vehicular traffic. They do not constitute an expressway or limited-access motorway in the fashion of the Boulevard Périphérique; the speed limit on the boulevards is generally 50 km/h.

There are also bus lanes separated from the normal lanes of traffic, and a bicycle path on the sidewalk has been installed. The Paris Tramway Line 3a (Ile-de-France) follows the boulevards of the marshals along the southern edge of the city, while line 3b follows the northern edge. There is no tramway on a section of the route in the west that is generally near the Bois de Boulogne.

Places of interest 
Some specific sites near the boulevards are:

 Bois de Boulogne
 Bois de Vincennes and the Throne carnival
 Cité Internationale Universitaire de Paris
 City of Science and Industry
 Heliport de Paris - Issy-les-Moulineaux
 Hôpital Européen Georges-Pompidou
 Robert Debré Pediatric Hospital
 Marmottan Museum
 Palais des Sports de Paris
 Parc André Citroën
 Parc de la Butte du Chapeau-Rouge
 The Fairgrounds at the Versailles gate
 Parc Georges Brassens
 Parc Kellermann
 Parc Montsouris
 Parc des Princes
 Stade Charlety

References

See also 
 Ring road
 City gates of Paris
 Louis Alexandre Berthier
 Jean-Baptiste Bessières
 Guillaume Marie Anne Brune
 Louis-Nicolas Davout
 Laurent de Gouvion Saint-Cyr
 Jean-Baptiste Jourdan
 François Christophe de Kellermann
 Jean Lannes
 François Joseph Lefebvre
 Jacques MacDonald
 André Masséna
 Édouard Adolphe Casimir Joseph Mortier
 Joachim Murat
 Michel Ney
 Józef Antoni Poniatowski
 Jean-Mathieu-Philibert Sérurier
 Jean-de-Dieu Soult
 Louis Gabriel Suchet
 Claude Victor-Perrin, Duc de Belluno

Marshals of France
Geography of Paris
Boulevards named after Marshals of France
Lists of roads in France